This is a comprehensive listing that highlights significant achievements and milestones based upon the Billboard Hot 100 chart. It spans the period from the issue dated January 1, 1955 to present. The Billboard Hot 100 began with the issue dated August 4, 1958, and is currently the standard popular music chart in the United States.

Prior to the creation of the Hot 100, Billboard published four singles charts: "Best Sellers in Stores", "Most Played by Jockeys", "Most Played in Jukeboxes" and "The Top 100". These charts, which ranged from 20 to 100 slots, were phased out at different times between 1957 and 1958. Though technically not part of the Hot 100 chart history, select data from these charts are included for computational purposes, and to avoid unenlightening or misleading characterizations.

All items listed below are from the Hot 100 era, unless otherwise noted (pre-Hot 100 charts).

All-time achievements 
In 2008, for the 50th anniversary of the Hot 100, Billboard magazine compiled a ranking of the 100 best-performing songs on the chart over the 50 years, along with the best-performing artists. In 2013, Billboard revised the rankings for the chart's 55th anniversary edition. In 2015, Billboard revised the rankings again. In 2018, the rankings were revised again for the Billboard chart's 60th anniversary. In 2021, Billboard revised the rankings again upon the ascendance of "Blinding Lights" to the top spot on the list. Shown below are the top 10 songs and top 10 artists over the 63-year period of the Hot 100, through November 2021. Also shown are the artists placing the most songs on the overall "all-time" top 100 song list.

Top 10 songs of all time (1958–2021) 

Source:

Top 10 artists of all time (1958–2021) 

Source:

Artists with the most all-time top 100 songs (1958–2021)

Songs milestones

Most weeks at number one 

Pre-Hot 100 notes:
 In 1956, Elvis Presley's "Hound Dog" / "Don't Be Cruel" was number 1 on the "Best Sellers in Stores" and "Most Played in Jukeboxes" charts for 11 weeks.
 In 1955, The McGuire Sisters' "Sincerely" was number 1 on the "Most Played by Jockeys" chart for 10 weeks.
 In 1955, Pérez Prado's "Cherry Pink and Apple Blossom White" was number 1 on the "Best Sellers in Stores" chart for 10 weeks.

Additional notes:
 Before the use of Nielsen SoundScan and Nielsen Broadcast Data Systems to compile the Hot 100 in late 1991, the most number of weeks a single spent at number one on the Hot 100 was 10. This occurred twice, with Debby Boone's "You Light Up My Life" in 1977, and Olivia Newton-John's "Physical" in 1981–82. Five additional singles managed nine weeks at number one during the first 34 years of the chart (1958–1992). In October 1992, the first single to top the Hot 100 for more than 10 weeks was Boyz II Men's "End of the Road", which accumulated 13 weeks at number one by November that year.

Source:

Most weeks at number two (without hitting number one) 

Note: Three songs managed more than 10 weeks apiece at number two, but peaked at number one, thus making them ineligible to be listed above: The Kid Laroi and Justin Bieber's "Stay" (2021–22 for a record 14 weeks), Whitney Houston's "Exhale (Shoop Shoop)" (1995–96 for 11 weeks), and Olivia Rodrigo's "Good 4 U" (2021 for 11 weeks).

Most total weeks in the top two

Most total weeks in the top three

Most total weeks in the top five

Most total weeks in the top ten

Most total weeks on the Hot 100

Biggest jump to number one 

Changes in when the eligibility of a single first begins, as well as more accurate digital download totals, have made abrupt chart jumps more commonplace. From 1955 to 2001, under Billboards previous methodologies, only two singles ascended directly to No. 1 from a previous position beneath the Top 20: The Beatles' "Can't Buy Me Love", which jumped from No. 27 to the top slot in April 1964, and Brandy and Monica's "The Boy Is Mine" which jumped from No. 23 to No. 1 in June 1998.

Biggest single-week upward movements 

Under Billboards previous methodologies, jumps of this magnitude were rare. One exception was Jeannie C. Riley's "Harper Valley PTA," which advanced 74 slots in August 1968; this upward acceleration went unmatched for 30 years, but has been surpassed over a dozen times since 2006. Changes in when the eligibility of a single first begins, as well as more accurate digital download totals, have made abrupt chart jumps more commonplace.

Longest climbs to number one 

† – Non-consecutive weeks on the Hot 100 before it was ranked number one
Note: Ariana Grande was added to the artist credits on "Die for You" the week the song reached number one, as a remix of the song featuring Grande had been released and counted for the first time.

Biggest drop from number one 
This list does not include a record which has dropped from number 1 off the Hot 100 altogether; see the Holiday songs section below.

Biggest single-week downward movements 

Source:

Biggest drops off the Hot 100

Non-holiday songs 

Below are songs not connected to Christmas or the holiday season. (A special section for the holiday songs is below, as a few of those songs set higher records for dropping off the Hot 100 in early 2019 and 2020.)

†† – "Purple Rain" and "When Doves Cry" reappeared on the Hot 100 for two weeks in 2016, and the above reflects their re-entries only. When the songs originally charted in 1984, their chart positions in their final week on the Hot 100 were well below the top 10.

Prior to 2008, the biggest drop off the Hot 100 was "Nights in White Satin" by The Moody Blues, which ranked at No. 17 in its final week on the chart in December 1972. This high drop-off position was matched in January 1975 by "Junior's Farm" by Paul McCartney and Wings. The record descent held for over three decades.  Each song above dropped off the Hot 100 upon four or fewer weeks; "Nights in White Satin" and "Junior's Farm" dropped off after 18 and 12 weeks, respectively.

Source:

Holiday songs 
During November and December beginning some time in the 2010s, these songs have regularly appeared on the Hot 100, generally departing from the chart once the holiday season ends in January. More recently, they have reached into the top ten, and in 2019, for only the second time ever on the Hot 100 (the first since 1958), made it to number one. This has led to all-time records for dropping off the Hot 100, including from number one, as the songs depart regardless of their final chart positions during the season. Only the highest drop-off position per song is listed and its most recent date if achieved more than once, like "All I Want for Christmas Is You", which first dropped off the Hot 100 from number one on January 11, 2020, and did so again in 2022 and 2023.

Songs hitting number one for different artists 
 "Go Away Little Girl" – Steve Lawrence (1963) and Donny Osmond (1971)
 "The Loco-Motion" – Little Eva (1962) and Grand Funk (1974)
 "Please Mr. Postman" – The Marvelettes (1961) and The Carpenters (1975)
 "Venus" – Shocking Blue (1970) and Bananarama (1986)
 "Lean on Me" – Bill Withers (1972) and Club Nouveau (1987)
 "You Keep Me Hangin' On" – The Supremes (1966) and Kim Wilde (1987)
 "When a Man Loves a Woman" – Percy Sledge (1966) and Michael Bolton (1991)
 "I'll Be There" – The Jackson 5 (1970) and Mariah Carey (1992)
 "Lady Marmalade" – Labelle (1975) and Christina Aguilera / Lil' Kim / Mýa / Pink (2001)

Source:

Non-English language number-ones 
 "Nel Blu Dipinto Di Blu (Volare)" – Domenico Modugno (Italian – August 18, 1958 for five non-consecutive weeks)
 "Sukiyaki" – Kyu Sakamoto (Japanese – June 15, 1963 for three weeks)
 "Dominique" – The Singing Nun (French – December 7, 1963 for four weeks)
 "Rock Me Amadeus" – Falco (English/German – March 29, 1986 for three weeks)
 "La Bamba" – Los Lobos (Spanish – August 29, 1987 for three weeks)
 "Macarena (Bayside Boys Mix)" – Los del Río (English/Spanish – August 3, 1996 for fourteen weeks)
 "Despacito" – Luis Fonsi and Daddy Yankee featuring Justin Bieber (English/Spanish – May 27, 2017 for sixteen weeks)
 "Life Goes On" – BTS (Korean/English – December 5, 2020 for one week)

Instrumental number-ones 

 "The Happy Organ" – Dave "Baby" Cortez (May 11, 1959 for one week)
 "Sleep Walk" – Santo & Johnny (September 21, 1959 for two weeks)
 "Theme from A Summer Place" – Percy Faith (February 22, 1960 for nine weeks)
 "Wonderland by Night" – Bert Kaempfert (January 9, 1961 for three weeks)
 "Calcutta" – Lawrence Welk (February 13, 1961 for two weeks)
 "Stranger on the Shore" – Mr. Acker Bilk (May 26, 1962 for one week)
 "The Stripper" – David Rose (July 7, 1962 for one week)
 "Telstar" – The Tornados (December 22, 1962 for three weeks)
 "Love Is Blue" – Paul Mauriat (February 10, 1968 for five weeks)
 "Grazing in the Grass" – Hugh Masekela (July 20, 1968 for two weeks)
 "Love Theme from Romeo and Juliet" – Henry Mancini (June 28, 1969 for two weeks)
 "Frankenstein" – The Edgar Winter Group (May 26, 1973 for one week)
 "Love's Theme" – Love Unlimited Orchestra (February 9, 1974 for one week)
 "TSOP (The Sound of Philadelphia)"† – MFSB and The Three Degrees (April 20, 1974 for two weeks)
 "Pick Up the Pieces"† – Average White Band (February 22, 1975 for one week)
 "The Hustle"† – Van McCoy and the Soul City Symphony (July 26, 1975 for one week)
 "Fly, Robin, Fly"† – Silver Convention (November 29, 1975 for three weeks)
 "Theme from S.W.A.T." – Rhythm Heritage (February 28, 1976 for one week)
 "A Fifth of Beethoven" – Walter Murphy and the Big Apple Band (October 9, 1976 for one week)
 "Gonna Fly Now"† – Bill Conti (July 2, 1977 for one week)
 "Star Wars Theme/Cantina Band" – Meco (October 1, 1977 for two weeks)
 "Rise" – Herb Alpert (October 20, 1979 for two weeks)
 "Chariots of Fire" – Vangelis (May 8, 1982 for one week)
 "Miami Vice Theme" – Jan Hammer (November 9, 1985 for one week)
 "Harlem Shake"† – Baauer (March 2, 2013 for five weeks)

† – Contains vocal part, but is considered an instrumental. See  for more.

Artist achievements

Most number-one singles 

† – The biggest number-one listed by each artist reflects its overall performance on the Hot 100, as calculated by Billboard, and may not necessarily be the single which spent the most weeks at No. 1 for the artist, such as Madonna's "Like a Virgin" (six weeks at No. 1, compared to seven for "Take a Bow"), Mariah Carey's "We Belong Together" (fourteen weeks at No. 1, compared to sixteen for her duet with Boyz II Men, "One Sweet Day"), Janet Jackson's "Miss You Much" (four weeks at No. 1, compared to eight for "That's the Way Love Goes") and Michael Jackson's duet with Paul McCartney, "Say Say Say" (six weeks at No. 1, compared to seven for both his solo singles "Billie Jean" and "Black or White").

‡ – Pre-Hot 100 charts and Hot 100.
 Billboard now credits the dual No. 1 Presley single "Don't Be Cruel"/"Hound Dog" as a single chart entity, and credits Presley with 17 number one singles. "Don't Be Cruel"/"Hound Dog" spent 11 weeks at No. 1, "Hound Dog" for 6 weeks, "Don't Be Cruel" for 5 weeks. Many chart statisticians however, such as Joel Whitburn, still list Presley as having 18 number ones.

 If counting Drake's uncredited feature on Travis Scott's "Sicko Mode", then he would be listed with 12 total number ones.

Most cumulative weeks at number one 

† – Pre-Hot 100 charts and Hot 100. Presley is sometimes credited with an "80th week" that occurred when "All Shook Up" spent a ninth week on top of the "Most Played in Jukeboxes" chart. Although Billboards chart statistician Joel Whitburn still counts this 80th week based on preexisting research, Billboard magazine itself has since revised its methodology and officially credits Presley with 79 weeks. Much of Presley's total factors in pre-Hot 100 data. If counting from the August 1958 Hot 100 inception, Presley totaled 22 weeks at No. 1.

 Note: For singer Fergie, if Black Eyed Peas is included, this would put Fergie on the list with 34 weeks at No. 1.
 Note: For singer Michael Jackson, if The Jackson 5, which would also be later known as The Jacksons, is included, this would give Michael Jackson 47 cumulative weeks at No. 1.
 Note: For singer Beyoncé, if Destiny's Child is included, this would give Beyoncé 61 cumulative weeks at No. 1.
 Note: For singer Diana Ross, if The Supremes are included, this would give Diana Ross 42 cumulative weeks at No. 1.
 Note: For each of the Beatles:
 If John Lennon's total weeks were to include the Beatles, this would give John Lennon 65 cumulative weeks at No. 1.
 If Paul McCartney's total weeks were to include the Beatles, as well as Wings, this would give Paul McCartney 89 cumulative weeks at No. 1.
 If George Harrison's total weeks were to include the Beatles, this would give George Harrison 65 cumulative weeks at No. 1.
 If Ringo Starr's total weeks were to include the Beatles, this would give Ringo Starr 61 cumulative weeks at No. 1.
Note: For rapper Drake, if the track "Sicko Mode" is included, this would give him 55 weeks at No. 1.

Most consecutive number-one singles 

 Houston's "Thinking About You" is not counted as interrupting  the streak, as it never appeared on the Hot 100, due to not being released to Pop radio. Likewise, Perry's "Not Like the Movies" and "Circle the Drain" were only promotional singles, not radio singles.
 With the streak spanning from her debut single "Vision of Love" until "Emotions," Mariah Carey became the first artist in Hot 100 history to have their first 5 solo singles reach No. 1 on the chart.

Sources:

Most consecutive weeks simultaneously topping the Hot 100 and Billboard 200 

{| class="wikitable"
|-
!Number ofweeks||Artist||Year(s)charted||Singles||Albums
|-
| rowspan=2 style="text-align:center;" |12|| The Beatles|||| "I Want to Hold Your Hand",  "She Loves You", "Can't Buy Me Love" || Meet the Beatles!,  The Beatles' Second Album
|-
| Whitney Houston||  || "I Will Always Love You" || The Bodyguard: Original Soundtrack Album
|-
| style="text-align:center;" |8|| Bee Gees |||| "Night Fever" || Saturday Night Fever|-
| rowspan=3 style="text-align:center;" |7|| Michael Jackson|||| "Billie Jean" || Thriller|-
| The Monkees |||| "I'm a Believer" || The Monkees, More of the Monkees|-
| Drake |||| "One Dance" (featuring Wizkid and Kyla) || Views|-
| rowspan=3 style="text-align:center;" |6|| The Police |||| "Every Breath You Take" || Synchronicity|-
| 50 Cent |||| "Candy Shop" || The Massacre|-
| Adele |||| "Hello" || 25|-
| rowspan=7 style="text-align:center;" |5|| Simon & Garfunkel |||| "Bridge Over Troubled Water" || Bridge Over Troubled Water|-
| Carole King |||| "It's Too Late"/"I Feel the Earth Move" || Tapestry|-
| John Lennon |||| "(Just Like) Starting Over" || Double Fantasy|-
| Janet Jackson |||| "That's the Way Love Goes" || Janet.|-
| Usher |||| "Yeah!" || Confessions|-
| Drake |||| "Nice for What", "In My Feelings" || Scorpion|-
| Encanto cast |||| "We Don't Talk About Bruno" || Encanto (Original Motion Picture Soundtrack)|}

Sources:

 Most consecutive years charting a number-one single 

† – Pre-Hot 100 charts and Hot 100.

Source:

 Most number-one singles in a calendar year 

† – Pre-Hot 100 charts.
Chart notes: If counting Presley's dual hit song "Don't Be Cruel/Hound Dog" separately, then Elvis has 5 for 1956. Some Presley songs included here charted No. 1 on Cashbox, but not on the Billboard Top 100, the precursor to the Billboard Hot 100.

If counting Drake's feature on Travis Scott's "Sicko Mode", he would be included on the list with 4 for 2018 ("God's Plan", "Nice for What", and "In My Feelings")

Sources: 

 Most number-two singles 

 If Drake's appearance on "BedRock" as a member of Young Money is counted, he would be listed with a total of 9 singles.
 If Michael Jackson's time with The Jackson 5 and his uncredited appearance on "Somebody's Watching Me" are counted, he would appear on the list with 6 singles.
 If Paul McCartney's time with The Beatles is counted, he would appear on the list with 5 singles.
Source:

 Most top five singles 

 Most top 10 singles 

† – All but one of Mariah Carey's top 10 singles also reached the top 5, the exception being "Obsessed", which peaked at No. 7.

 Most cumulative weeks in the top 10 

† – Rihanna is the youngest (23) soloist to earn at least 200 weeks in the top 10. Justin Bieber is the youngest male (25) soloist to do so.

 Most consecutive weeks in the top 10 

Source:

 Most number-one debuts 

 Note: If Young Thug's uncredited appearance on the track "This Is America" is included, this would put him on the list with 3 debuts at No. 1.

Since 2009, at least one song has debuted at number one per year. 2020 holds the record for most debuts at number one in a calendar year, with twelve.
Source:

 Most top 10 debuts 

 Most top 40 entries 

 Most Hot 100 entries 

† – Elvis Presley's career predated the inception of the Hot 100 by two years. He has charted 150 singles on Billboard if tracking his entire career.

‡ – Lil Baby (age 27 years, 141 days) is the youngest soloist to accumulate at least 100 entries on the Hot 100, a record set previously by Justin Bieber (age 27 years, 145 days).

 Most consecutive weeks on Hot 100 

 After his 188-week streak spanning from February 3, 2018–September 4, 2021, Drake was only off the Hot 100 for a single week before beginning a new streak of 32 weeks, stretching between the debut of 21 songs from Certified Lover Boy on September 18, 2021 up until April 30, 2022, when "P Power" spent its final week on the chart. Had he remained on the Hot 100 for that single week, he would have logged 221 consecutive weeks on the chart, making it the 3rd longest streak of all time.

 Prior to her 154-week streak spanning from September 23, 2017–August 22, 2020, Halsey produced a 55-week streak stretching between the debut of "Closer" on August 20, 2016 up until September 9, 2017, when "Now or Never" spent its final week on the chart. Halsey was only off the Hot 100 for a single week before beginning her new streak on September 23, 2017. Had she remained on the Hot 100 for that single week, she would have logged 210 consecutive weeks on the chart, making it the 4th longest streak of all time.

 After his 142-week streak spanning from July 17, 2010–March 30, 2013, Chris Brown was only off the Hot 100 for two weeks before beginning a new streak of 161 weeks spanning from April 20, 2013–May 14, 2016. Had he remained on the Hot 100 for those two weeks, he would have logged 305 consecutive weeks on the chart, making it the 3rd longest streak of all time.

Source:

 Self-replacement at number one 

 The Beatles† – "I Want to Hold Your Hand" → "She Loves You" (March 21, 1964); "She Loves You" → "Can't Buy Me Love" (April 4, 1964)
 Boyz II Men – "I'll Make Love to You" → "On Bended Knee" (December 3, 1994)
 Puff Daddy – "I'll Be Missing You" (Puff Daddy and Faith Evans featuring 112) → "Mo Money Mo Problems" (The Notorious B.I.G. featuring Puff Daddy and Mase) (August 30, 1997)
 Ja Rule – "Always on Time" (Ja Rule featuring Ashanti) → "Ain't It Funny" (Jennifer Lopez featuring Ja Rule) (March 9, 2002)
 Nelly – "Hot in Herre" → "Dilemma" (Nelly featuring Kelly Rowland) (August 17, 2002)
 OutKast – "Hey Ya!" → "The Way You Move" (OutKast featuring Sleepy Brown) (February 14, 2004)
 Usher – "Yeah!" (Usher featuring Lil Jon and Ludacris) → "Burn" (May 22, 2004); "Burn" → "Confessions Part II" (July 24, 2004)
 T.I. – "Whatever You Like" → "Live Your Life" (T.I. featuring Rihanna) (October 18, 2008); "Whatever You Like" → "Live Your Life" (November 15, 2008)
 The Black Eyed Peas – "Boom Boom Pow" → "I Gotta Feeling" (July 11, 2009)
 Taylor Swift – "Shake It Off" → "Blank Space" (November 29, 2014)
 The Weeknd – "Can't Feel My Face" → "The Hills" (October 3, 2015)
 Justin Bieber – "Sorry" → "Love Yourself" (February 13, 2016); "I'm the One" (DJ Khaled featuring Justin Bieber, Quavo, Chance the Rapper and Lil Wayne) → "Despacito" (Luis Fonsi and Daddy Yankee featuring Justin Bieber) (May 27, 2017)
 Drake – "God's Plan" → "Nice for What" (April 21, 2018); "Nice for What" → "In My Feelings" (July 21, 2018)
BTS‡ – "Butter" → "Permission to Dance" (July 24, 2021); "Permission to Dance" → "Butter" (July 31, 2021)

† – The Beatles are the only act in history to have three consecutive, self-replacing No. 1s.

‡ – BTS are the only act in history to replace themselves at No. 1 two weeks in a row.

Source:

 Most top positions simultaneously occupied 

 Prior to 2000, only the Beatles, the Bee Gees and Puff Daddy had weeks where they simultaneously occupied the top two positions. The Beatles had also simultaneously occupied the top three, four and five positions during various weeks in early 1964. Since 2000, numerous recording acts have simultaneously occupied the top two, including Usher, Mariah Carey, the Black Eyed Peas, the Weeknd, Justin Bieber and Drake. On February 23, 2019, Ariana Grande became the first act since the Beatles and first solo artist to simultaneously occupy the top three.

 Most simultaneous entries in the top 10 

 Only the Beatles and the Bee Gees managed at least three simultaneous top ten singles before the use of Nielsen SoundScan and Nielsen Broadcast Data Systems to compile the Hot 100 in late 1991. The first to achieve three since then was Ashanti in March 2002.

 Posthumous number-ones 
 Otis Redding (d. December 10, 1967) – "(Sittin' On) The Dock of the Bay" (March 16, 1968)
 Janis Joplin (d. October 4, 1970) – "Me and Bobby McGee" (March 20, 1971)
 Jim Croce (d. September 20, 1973) – "Time in a Bottle" (December 29, 1973)
 John Lennon (d. December 8, 1980) – "(Just Like) Starting Over" (December 27, 1980)
 The Notorious B.I.G. (d. March 9, 1997) – "Hypnotize" (May 3, 1997) and "Mo Money Mo Problems" (August 30, 1997)
 Soulja Slim (d. November 26, 2003) – "Slow Motion" (Juvenile featuring Soulja Slim) (August 7, 2004)
 Static Major (d. February 25, 2008) – "Lollipop" (Lil Wayne featuring Static Major) (May 3, 2008)
 XXXTentacion (d. June 18, 2018) – "Sad!" (June 30, 2018)

Source:

 Age records 
 Louis Armstrong (age ) is the oldest artist to top the Hot 100. He set that record with "Hello, Dolly!" on May 9, 1964.
 Mariah Carey (age ) is the oldest female artist to top the Hot 100. She set the record on December 17, 2022, when "All I Want for Christmas Is You" reached number one for its fourth consecutive run on the Hot 100 and its ninth overall week. While Carey is the oldest female artist, she recorded "All I Want for Christmas Is You" almost three decades earlier in 1994, when she was 25. Cher previously held the record (age ), when "Believe" spent four weeks at number one, from March 13 to April 3, 1999.
 Michael Jackson (age ) is the youngest artist to top the Hot 100. He achieved the record, as part of the Jackson 5, with "I Want You Back" on January 31, 1970.
 Stevie Wonder (age ) is the youngest solo artist to top the Hot 100. He set the record with "Fingertips Pt. 2" on August 10, 1963.
 Little Peggy March (age ) is the youngest female artist to top the Hot 100. The song which established this record for her was "I Will Follow Him", which reached No. 1 on April 27, 1963.
 Olivia Rodrigo (age ) is the youngest solo artist to debut at number one on the Hot 100. She set the record with "Drivers License" on January 23, 2021.
 Justin Bieber (age ) is the youngest male solo artist to debut atop the Hot 100. He set the record with "What Do You Mean?" on September 19, 2015.
 Rihanna (age ) is the youngest artist to collect 10 chart-toppers on the Hot 100. She set the record with "S&M" on April 11, 2011.
 Fred Stobaugh (age ) is the oldest living artist to chart on the Hot 100. He was featured on the Green Shoe Studio song "Oh Sweet Lorraine", which ranked at No. 42 on September 14, 2013. The previous record was held by Tony Bennett, who was  old when his song "Body and Soul", a duet with Amy Winehouse, ranked at No. 87 on October 1, 2011.
 French-born Jordy Lemoine (age ) is the youngest artist to chart on the Hot 100. He established the record when his song "Dur dur d'être bébé! (It's Tough to Be a Baby)", where he is credited simply as Jordy, entered the chart on June 19, 1993.

 Gap records 
Her single "Believe" hit No. 1 on March 13, 1999, her first time on top since "Dark Lady" on March 23, 1974.
 The record for the longest wait from an artist's Hot 100 debut entry to its first No. 1 belongs to Santana, with 30 years between the time the band first cracked the Hot 100 with "Jingo" (October 25, 1969) and the first of 12 weeks at No. 1 with "Smooth," featuring Rob Thomas (October 23, 1999).
 The record for most Hot 100 entries before a No. 1 is held by Future, whose feature on Drake's "Way 2 Sexy" alongside Young Thug scored him his first No. 1 single on his 126th chart entry.
 When "4th Dimension" by Kids See Ghosts featuring Louis Prima debuted at No. 42 for the week of June 23, 2018, Prima became the artist with the longest overall span of singles on the Hot 100 –  on account of his single "Wonderland by Night" which last appeared at No. 89 on the Hot 100, dated February 13, 1961.
Bobby Helms holds the longest wait for an artist's first top 10: 60 years, four months and two weeks. His song "Dreams" debuted on the third Hot 100 ever (dated August 18, 1958), and "Jingle Bell Rock" reached the top 10 on the chart dated January 5, 2019.
Nat King Cole's "The Christmas Song (Merry Christmas to You)" holds the record for the longest trip to the Hot 100's top 10: 62 years and 26 days. It first appeared on the Hot 100 dated December 12, 1960 and reached the top 10 on the chart dated January 7, 2023 peaking at No. 7. Cole additionally holds the record for the longest break between Hot 100 top 10s, with a span of 59 years, six months, and one week. His single "Those Lazy-Hazy-Crazy Days of Summer" reached No. 6 in June 1963, and his return to the top 10 with "The Christmas Song (Merry Christmas to You)" reached No. 9 on the chart dated January 7, 2023. 
Mariah Carey holds the record gap between first and most recent No. 1 on the Hot 100 over the longest period of time: 29 years, four months and two weeks, dating to her first week at No. 1 on the chart dated August 4, 1990, with "Vision of Love" to her most recent No. 1, "All I Want for Christmas Is You", which reached number one on the chart dated December 21, 2019. "All I Want for Christmas Is You" also has the longest span from a song's first week at No. 1 on the Hot 100 to its latest: three years and two weeks (Dec. 21, 2019–Jan. 7, 2023).
 Lady Gaga holds the record for the longest span of No. 1 debuts with nine years, three months, and one week. She surpassed Justin Bieber, who held the record previously with four years and five months.
 BTS holds the record for the shortest span to accumulate three No. 1 debuts, with four months and four days.

 Album achievements 
 Most number-one singles from one album 

Source:

 Saturday Night Fever generated number-one singles for two different artists: "How Deep Is Your Love", "Stayin' Alive" and "Night Fever" by the Bee Gees; and "If I Can't Have You" by Yvonne Elliman. A Fifth Of Beethoven by Walter Murphy, You Should Be Dancing and Jive Talkin' by the Bee Gees all reached No. 1 but are from earlier albums, so these aren't generated from "Saturday Night Fever".
 Katy Perry's Teenage Dream: The Complete Confection was a reissue of the Teenage Dream album, and featured an additional single, "Part of Me", which peaked at number one on the Billboard Hot 100. This brings her actual total to six. However, this does not count since the single comes from a reissue of the album and not the original release.

 Most top ten songs from one album 

† – Michael Jackson, Bruce Springsteen, and Janet Jackson jointly hold the record for most top 10 officially-released singles from one album with seven (from Thriller, Born in the U.S.A., and Janet Jackson's Rhythm Nation 1814, respectively).

Source:

 Other album achievements 
 Janet Jackson's Janet Jackson's Rhythm Nation 1814 has the most top 5 singles, with 7.
 Janet Jackson has the most albums with five or more Top 10 hits. Those albums are Control, Janet Jackson's Rhythm Nation 1814, and janet. Drake tied this record in 2022 with Scorpion, Certified Lover Boy, and Her Loss.
 Morgan Wallen's One Thing at a Time placed all 36 of its songs simultaneously on the Billboard Hot 100 on the week of March 18, 2023, with 27 debuts joining nine previously-charting songs. Previously, Drake's Scorpion placed a record-breaking all 25 songs listed in the Billboard Hot 100 at the same time, on the July 14, 2018 chart, while he still had two more songs entered, eclipsing his previous record of 22 from his album More Life about one year earlier, on April 8, 2017, and 18 from his album Views two years earlier, on May 21, 2016.
 Taylor Swift's Midnights became the first album to have 10 of its tracks occupy the entire top 10, as well as having 10 track debuts in the top 10 on the November 5, 2022 chart, eclipsing Drake's Certified Lover Boy, which saw 9 of its tracks debut in the top 10 and occupy 9 of the top 10 slots on the chart on the September 18, 2021 chart.

NOTE: Numbers listed here are, per Billboards rules, over one release.

 Producer achievements 
 Producers with the most number-one singles 

† – Pre-Hot 100 charts and Hot 100

Source:

 Songwriter achievements 
 Songwriters with the most number-one singles 

Source:

 Most number-one singles in a calendar year 

† – Chronologically sequential, replacing each other at No. 1
†† – Holds all-time record of writing the most consecutively charted (self-replacing) No. 1 songs on the Hot 100, with 4.
††† – Hold all-time record of writing the most consecutive No. 1 A-side singles, with 6. Record includes these five 1965 A-sides and "We Can Work It Out", which hit No. 1 in January 1966.

Source:

 Selected additional Hot 100 achievements 

 The first No. 1 song on the Hot 100 was "Poor Little Fool" by Ricky Nelson (August 4, 1958).
 The shortest No. 1 song of all time is "Stay" by Maurice Williams And The Zodiacs (November 21, 1960). It is 1 minute and 38 seconds long.
The longest No. 1 song of all time is "All Too Well (Taylor's Version)" by Taylor Swift (November 27, 2021). It is 10 minutes and 13 seconds long.
 The No. 1 song with the longest title contains 41 words and topped the charts for Stars on 45 in June 1981. Though DJs announced it as the Stars on 45 Medley, its official title is "Medley: Intro 'Venus' / Sugar Sugar / No Reply / I'll Be Back / Drive My Car / Do You Want to Know a Secret / We Can Work It Out / I Should Have Known Better / Nowhere Man / You're Going to Lose That Girl / Stars on 45."
 The No. 1 song in the first week Billboard incorporated sales and airplay data from Nielsen SoundScan and Nielsen Broadcast Data Systems was "Set Adrift on Memory Bliss" by P.M. Dawn (November 30, 1991).
 On September 2, 1995, "You Are Not Alone" by Michael Jackson became the first song to debut at No. 1. The rest of that year saw three additional number-one debuts, including two by Mariah Carey. The four number-one debuts in 1995 would hold as the most in one calendar year until 2018, when it was matched. This record was topped in 2020, when 12 songs debuted at number one. A total of 65 number-one debuts have occurred through the chart dated January 28, 2023.
 The No. 1 song in the first week Billboard allowed songs without a commercial single release to chart on the Hot 100 was "I'm Your Angel" by R. Kelly and Céline Dion (December 5, 1998). Though the song was making its first appearance on the Hot 100 that week, Billboard did not consider it a debut at No. 1, since it appeared on unpublished test charts prior to the allowance of airplay-only songs on the main chart. "I'm Your Angel" also entered the Hot 100 Singles Sales chart that week at No. 1, so it would have been ineligible to chart on the Hot 100 before then.
 The first "airplay-only" song to reach No. 1 (no points from a commercial single release) was "Try Again" by Aaliyah (June 17, 2000).
 "We Don't Talk About Bruno", by Carolina Gaitán, Mauro Castillo, Adassa, Rhenzy Feliz, Diane Guerrero, Stephanie Beatriz, and the cast of Encanto, set the record for the most credited artists on a No. 1 song (February 5, 2022).
 Morgan Wallen holds the record for the most entries in the Hot 100 during a one-week period, with 36 on the March 18, 2023 chart. The Beatles had long held this record, occupying 14 positions on the Hot 100 dated April 11, 1964, a feat unmatched for nearly 51 years. On March 7, 2015, Drake tied the Beatles mark, and he equaled it again on October 17 that year. Justin Bieber then reset the record to 17 on December 5, 2015, before Drake reclaimed the record with 20 on May 21, 2016, broke his own record with 24 on the April 8, 2017 chart, and broke it again with 27 on July 14, 2018.
The Beatles are the only artists to simultaneously hold the top 2 spots on the Billboard Hot 100 singles chart and Billboard 200 albums chart. They achieved this feat for nine consecutive weeks, from February 29, 1964, to April 25, 1964. For the first five weeks of that run, through March 28, 1964, "I Want to Hold Your Hand" and "She Loves You" were the No. 1 and No. 2 singles (which swapped positions during March 1964), while Meet the Beatles! and Introducing... The Beatles held the top 2 spots on the albums charts. For the remaining weeks of the run, "Can't Buy Me Love" and their cover of "Twist and Shout" were the No. 1 and No. 2 singles, while Meet the Beatles! and Introducing... The Beatles continued their reign as the top 2 albums.
 On February 23, 2019, Ariana Grande became the first act since the Beatles and first solo artist to simultaneously occupy the top three.
 Barry Gibb, Robin Gibb, John Lennon, Paul McCartney, Ariana Grande, Drake, and Taylor Swift hold the record of writing all of the top-three singles for one week. The Gibbs co-wrote the top 3 singles for the week of March 18, 1978 – No. 1 "Night Fever" and No. 2 "Stayin' Alive" for the Bee Gees, and No. 3 "Emotion" for Samantha Sang. Lennon and McCartney co-wrote the top 3 singles for the week of March 14, 1964 – No. 1 "I Want to Hold Your Hand", No. 2 "She Loves You", and No. 3 "Please Please Me", all for The Beatles. They continued this record the following week of March 21, 1964, when "She Loves You" switched places with "I Want to Hold Your Hand". Grande wrote the top 3 singles for the week of February 23, 2019 – No. 1 "7 Rings", No. 2 "Break Up with Your Girlfriend, I'm Bored", and No. 3 "Thank U, Next", all for herself. Drake wrote the top 3 singles for the week of March 20, 2021, and the top 5 singles for the week of September 18, 2021, both times all for himself. Swift wrote the entire top 10 songs for the week of November 5, 2022.
 Justin Bieber is the first artist in history to achieve new No. 1 songs in consecutive weeks on the Hot 100. On the chart dated May 27, 2017, Luis Fonsi & Daddy Yankee's "Despacito" dethroned DJ Khaled's "I'm the One" which debuted at No. 1 a week prior, both songs on which he is a featured artist.
The Black Eyed Peas hold the record for the longest uninterrupted time at No. 1 on the Hot 100, a total of 26 consecutive weeks from April to October 2009. "Boom Boom Pow" spent the first 12 weeks on top, with "I Gotta Feeling" taking over for the remaining 14 weeks. Prior to August 2009, Usher held this record, spending 19 consecutive weeks on top of the chart in 2004 with "Yeah!" (12 weeks at No. 1) and "Burn" (first 7 of its 8 total weeks at No. 1).
 On December 4, 2010, Rihanna's "Only Girl (In the World)" reached the top spot two weeks after "What's My Name?", becoming the first time in Hot 100 history that an album's lead single hit No. 1 after the second single did.
On the chart dated January 28, 2017, Ed Sheeran became the first artist to debut more than one song in the top 10 for the same week: "Shape of You" debuted at No. 1, while "Castle on the Hill" entered at No. 6.

 Justin Bieber became the first artist to have seven songs from a debut album chart on the Hot 100, following the release of his debut seven-track EP My World on December 5, 2009.
Drake is the first artist to have a number-one debut replace another number-one debut. He did this April 21, 2018, when "Nice For What" replaced "God's Plan" at the summit, after the latter had spent eleven weeks on top.
 Ariana Grande is the only artist to have the lead single from each of her first six albums debut in the Hot 100's top 10.
 Ariana Grande is the first artist whose first five number-one songs all debuted at the top spot. She achieved this with the songs "Thank U, Next", "7 Rings", "Stuck With U", "Rain On Me", and "Positions" on the charts dated November 17, 2018, February 2, 2019, May 23, 2020, June 6, 2020, and November 6, 2020, respectively.
 In the list of August 17, 2019, Tool's "Fear Inoculum" broke the record of longest song to enter the Hot 100, with 10 minutes and 21 seconds and peaking at number 93.
 Creedence Clearwater Revival is the artist with the most songs to peak at No. 2 without achieving a No. 1 hit, with five ("Proud Mary", "Bad Moon Rising", "Green River", "Travelin' Band/Who'll Stop the Rain", "Lookin' Out My Back Door/Long as I Can See the Light"). Groups En Vogue and Blood, Sweat & Tears tie for second, with three each. All three of Blood, Sweat & Tears' No. 2 singles were released consecutively, making them the only act to achieve this feat.

 Taylor Swift is the first act to simultaneously debut two songs in the top-four and three songs in the top-six of the chart. She achieved it when "Cardigan", "The 1" and "Exile", debuted at numbers one, four and six, respectively, on the chart dated August 8, 2020.
 Ariana Grande is the first artist in history to debut three songs at No. 1 on the Hot 100 in a single calendar year. "Stuck With U", "Rain On Me", and "Positions" all debuted at number one in 2020.
 Taylor Swift is the first act in history to simultaneously debut at No. 1 on both the Billboard 200 and Billboard Hot 100 charts. She achieved it when her eighth studio album, Folklore, debuted atop the Billboard 200 in the same week as its lead single "Cardigan" debuted atop the Hot 100, on the charts dated August 8, 2020. She is also the first act in history to achieve the said record a total of four times. Her second time was with her ninth studio album, Evermore, and its lead single "Willow" (December 26, 2020); the third with Red (Taylor's Version) and "All Too Well (Taylor's Version)" (November 27, 2021); and the fourth with Midnights and its lead single, "Anti-Hero" (November 5, 2022).
 Morgan Wallen holds the record for the most new entries on a Hot 100 chart by any artist, with 27 on March 18, 2023.
 The Weeknd's 2019 song "Blinding Lights" holds the record for the highest re-entry in the charts history, after falling off the chart dated January 2, 2021 and re-entering the top ten at number 3 the following week.
 The chart dated March 20, 2021, marked the first time that the top four songs were all simultaneous debuts on the Hot 100. It was also the first time that the top three were all simultaneous debuts, with Drake carrying those three songs ("What's Next", "Wants and Needs" and "Lemon Pepper Freestyle") to become the first artist to debut in positions one, two and three on the same chart. (Debuting at number four was "Leave the Door Open" by Silk Sonic). On September 18, 2021, this record was broken when the top five songs were all Hot 100 debuts; all five were by Drake ("Way 2 Sexy", "Girls Want Girls", "Fair Trade", "Champagne Poetry", and "Knife Talk").
 Olivia Rodrigo is the first artist in history to debut their first two and first three singles inside the top 10 of the Hot 100. She achieved it with "Drivers License", "Deja Vu", and "Good 4 U".
 Sour (2021) by Olivia Rodrigo is the first debut album in history to score two number-one debuts on the Hot 100, doing so with "Drivers License" and "Good 4 U".
The chart dated May 29, 2021, marked the first time five songs simultaneously debuted inside the top 10 of the Hot 100. It was achieved by Olivia Rodrigo's "Good 4 U", J. Cole's "My Life", "Amari", "Pride is the Devil" and "95 South", which debuted at numbers 1, 2, 5, 7 and 8, respectively.

 "As It Was" by Harry Styles became the first song ever to have five separate runs at No. 1 on the Hot 100.
 On chart dated November 5, 2022, Taylor Swift became the first act to simultaneously occupy all of the top-10 positions, doing so with tracks from her tenth studio album Midnights. Male artists were absent from the top 10 for the first time ever; Swift and Lana Del Rey were the only artists present in the region. It also marked the least amount of artists present in the top 10 (two).

 See also 
 List of Billboard number-one singles
 List of artists who reached number one in the United States

 Notes 

 References 

 Additional sources 
 Fred Bronson's Billboard Book of Number 1 Hits, 5th Edition
 Christopher G. Feldman, The Billboard Book of No. 2 Singles
 Joel Whitburn's Top Pop Singles 1955–2008
 Joel Whitburn Presents the Billboard Pop Charts, 1955–1959
 Joel Whitburn Presents the Billboard Hot 100 Charts: The Sixties
 Joel Whitburn Presents the Billboard Hot 100 Charts: The Seventies
 Joel Whitburn Presents the Billboard Hot 100 Charts: The Eighties
 Joel Whitburn Presents the Billboard Hot 100 Charts: The Nineties
 Joel Whitburn Presents the Billboard Hot 100 Charts: The 2000s
 Additional information obtained can be verified within Billboard''s online archive services and print editions of the magazine.

Hot 100
Billboard Hot 100